Axoclinus cocoensis, known commonly as the Cocos triplefin, is a species of triplefin blenny. It is found only on shallow reefs around Cocos Island in the eastern Pacific Ocean, part of Costa Rica.

References

cocoensis
Fish described in 1991